Fernanda Ferreira (born 25 January 1985) is a Brazilian rower. She competed in the women's lightweight double sculls event at the 2016 Summer Olympics.

Recognition
She was recognized as one of the BBC's 100 women of 2017.

References

External links
 

1985 births
Living people
Brazilian female rowers
Olympic rowers of Brazil
Rowers at the 2016 Summer Olympics
Place of birth missing (living people)
BBC 100 Women